The 40th Robert Awards ceremony, presented by Danish Film Academy on 4 February 2023, to honour the best in Danish film and television of 2022. The ceremony took place at the Tivoli Hotel & Congress Centre in Copenhagen, Denmark and was hosted by actor and comedian Frederik Cilius.

Crime drama film Holy Spider won eleven awards out of nominations, including Best Danish Film. It was followed by A Lucky Man with two awards.

Historical drama series Carmen Curlers and workplace comedy series The Orchestra won three awards each in the television field, the former received the most nominations with seven.

Winners and nominees
The nominations were announced on 6 January 2023. Winners are listed first, highlighted in boldface, and indicated with a double dagger.

Film

Films with multiple nominations and awards

Television

Shows with multiple nominations and awards

References

Robert Awards ceremonies
2022 film awards
2023 in Denmark
2023 in Danish television